Llandinabo is a hamlet and civil parish in Herefordshire, England, and approximately six miles north-west of Ross-on-Wye. The population of the civil parish at the 2011 census was 59. The placename is Welsh and means "church of St Junabius".

References

External links

Villages in Herefordshire